Pennsylvania's 14th congressional district is located in the southwestern part of the state and includes all of Fayette County, Greene County, and Washington County, and most of Indiana, Westmoreland, and Somerset counties. It is represented by Republican Guy Reschenthaler.

Before 2018, the 14th district included the entire city of Pittsburgh and parts of surrounding suburbs. The Supreme Court of Pennsylvania redrew the district in February 2018 after ruling the previous map unconstitutional. The 14th and 18th districts swapped names and had their boundaries adjusted for the 2018 elections and representation thereafter.

List of members representing the district

Recent election results

2012

2014

2016

2018

2020

2022

See also
List of United States congressional districts
Pennsylvania's congressional districts

References

 Congressional Biographical Directory of the United States 1774–present

External links
 Congressional redistricting in Pennsylvania

14
1813 establishments in Pennsylvania
Constituencies established in 1813